Podgorje pri Pišecah is a settlement in the hills west of Bizeljsko in the Municipality of Brežice in eastern Slovenia. The area is part of the traditional region of Styria. It is now included with the rest of the municipality in the Lower Sava Statistical Region.

Geography
Podgorje pri Pišecah is a scattered settlement extending from the Dramlja Valley in the southeast to the Orlica Hills in the northwest, rising to the village's highest point at Big Peak. It includes the hamlets of Banovec, Brestovec, Debevec, Dramlje, Gradec, Kočni Dol, Okrog, Perdislovec, Vrh, Zagajca, and Zibot(i). Most of the settlement lies along the road from Pišece to Bizeljsko and on side roads extending into the vineyards.

Name
The name of the settlement was changed from Podgorje to Podgorje pri Pišecah in 1953.

History
During the Second World War, the Partisans operated a courier station at the Ulčnik farm in the village. In August 1944, Ustaša forces attacked the village, burning three farms and the village wine cellar.

References

External links
 Podgorje pri Pišecah on Geopedia

Populated places in the Municipality of Brežice